The Europe/Africa Zone is one of three zones of regional competition in the 2017 Fed Cup.

Group I 
 Venue: Tallink Tennis Centre, Tallinn, Estonia (indoor hard)
 Date: 8–11 February

The fourteen teams were divided into two pools of three teams and two pools of four teams. The four pool winners took part in promotion play-offs to determine the two nations advancing to the World Group II play-offs. The nations finishing last in their pools took part in relegation play-offs, with the two losing nations being relegated to Group II for 2018.

Seeding: The seeding was based on the Fed Cup Rankings of 14 November 2016 (shown in parentheses below).

Pools 

{{4TeamRR
| title=Pool D
| team-1-abbrev=SRB
| team-1= (3–0)
| team-2-abbrev=EST
| team-2= (2–1)| team-3-abbrev=BUL
| team-3= (1–2)
| team-4-abbrev=ISR
| team-4= (0–3)|          1v2=2–1 |1v3=2–1 |1v4=2–1
|2v1=1–2 |          2v3=2–1 |2v4=2–1
|3v1=1–2 |3v2=1–2 |          3v4=2–1
|4v1=1–2 |4v2=1–2 |4v3=1–2
}}

 Play-offs 

 Final placements 

 Group II 
 Venue: Šiauliai Tennis School, Šiauliai, Lithuania (indoor hard)
 Date: 19–22 April

The eight teams were divided into two pools of four teams. The two nations placing first and second took part in play-offs to determine the two nations advancing to Group I. The nations finishing third and last in their pools took part in relegation play-offs, with the two losing nations being relegated to Group III for 2018.

Seeding: The seeding was based on the Fed Cup Rankings of 13 February 2017 (shown in parentheses below).

 Pools 

 Play-offs 

 Final placements 

  and '' were relegated to Europe/Africa Zone Group III in 2018

Group III 
 Venue: National Tennis School & Tennis Club Acvila, Chișinău, Moldova (outdoor clay)
 Date: 13–17 June

The fifteen teams were divided into one pool of three teams and three pools of four teams. The four nations placing first took part in play-offs to determine the two nations advancing to Group II. 

Seeding: The seeding was based on the Fed Cup Rankings of 24 April 2017 (shown in parentheses below).

Pools

Play-offs

Final placements 

References 

 Fed Cup Result, 2017 Europe/Africa Group I
 Fed Cup Result, 2017 Europe/Africa Group II
 Fed Cup Result, 2017 Europe/Africa Group III

External links 
 Fed Cup website

 
Europe Africa
Tennis tournaments in Estonia
Tennis tournaments in Lithuania
Tennis tournaments in Moldova